Nonchalanta is a ghost town in Ness County, Kansas, United States.

History
Like many Kansas ghost towns, Nonchalanta grew and died over a span of just a few years. By 1885, the town was platted and named. Settlers arrived via covered wagon with the promise of free land and future railroad expansion through town. A church and a hotel were constructed, along with other businesses. Construction work began on a bank, and in 1887, a nearby post office was renamed from Candish to Nonchalanta.  A school was completed by 1888.  By 1890, many businesses had left with the cancellation of a planned railroad. The post office formally closed in 1930.

References

External links
 Ness County Maps: Current, Historic, KDOT

Ghost towns in Kansas
Former populated places in Ness County, Kansas